The 2017 ISU World Team Trophy is an international team figure skating competition that was held during the 2016–17 season. Participating countries selected two men's single skaters, two ladies' single skaters, one pair and one ice dancing entry to compete in a team format with points based on the skaters' placement.

Records
For complete list of figure skating records, see list of highest scores in figure skating.

The following new ISU best scores were set during this competition:

Entries

Changes to initial assignments

Results

Team standings

Men

Ladies
Evgenia Medvedeva set a new world record for the short program (80.85 points), for the free skating (160.46 points), and for the combined total (241.31 points).

Pairs

Ice dancing

References

External links
 Entries

ISU World Team Trophy In Figure Skating, 2017
ISU World Team Trophy in Figure Skating